Synclera is a genus of moths of the family Crambidae described by Julius Lederer in 1863.

Species
Synclera chlorophasma (Butler, 1878)
Synclera danalis (Hampson, 1893)
Synclera himachalensis Pajni & Rose, 1978  (from India)
Synclera jarbusalis (Walker, 1859)
Synclera nigropenultimalis Kirti, 1993
Synclera retractilinea (Hampson, 1917)
Synclera rotundalis (Hampson, 1893)
Synclera seychellensis J. C. Shaffer & Munroe, 2007 (from Seychelles)
Synclera stramineatis Kirti, 1993
Synclera subtessellalis (Walker, 1865) (from Congo & India)
Synclera tenuivittalis Turati, 1934
Synclera tibialis Moore, 1888
Synclera traducalis (Zeller, 1852)
Synclera univocalis (Walker, 1859) (from South Africa, India to Myanmar)

References

Pajni & Rose (1978). "Revision of the genus Pagyda Walker for the revalidation of its synonym Synclera Lederer along with the description of a new species [Synclera himachalensis] (Lepidoptera: Pyralidoidea: Pyraustidae)". Entomon. 3 (2): 215–219.

Spilomelinae
Crambidae genera
Taxa named by Julius Lederer